Kenneth Alfred Ham (born 20 October 1951) is an Australian Christian fundamentalist, young Earth creationist, apologist and former science teacher, living in the United States. He is the founder, CEO, and former president of Answers in Genesis (AiG), a Christian apologetics organization that operates the Creation Museum and the Ark Encounter.

Ham advocates biblical literalism, believing that the creation narrative in the Book of Genesis is historical fact and that the universe and the Earth were created together approximately 6,000 years ago, contrary to the scientific consensus that the Earth is about 4.5 billion years old and the universe is about 13.8 billion years old.

Early life
Ham was born 20 October 1951 in Cairns, Queensland. His father, Mervyn, was a Christian educator who served as a school principal in several schools throughout Queensland.

Ham earned a bachelor's degree in applied science (with an emphasis on environmental biology) from the Queensland Institute of Technology and holds a Diploma in Education from the University of Queensland. While at university, he was influenced by John C. Whitcomb and Henry M. Morris's 1961 book The Genesis Flood. Upon graduation in 1975, Ham began teaching science at a high school in Dalby, Queensland.

Career

In 1977, Ham began teaching at a high school in Brisbane, where he met John Mackay, another teacher who believed in young Earth creationism. According to Susan and William Trollinger, Ham was "appalled by the fact that some of his students assumed their textbooks that taught evolutionary science successfully proved the Bible to be untrue," and he said the experience "put a 'fire in my bones' to do something about the influence that evolutionary thinking was having on students and the public as a whole." In 1979, he resigned his teaching position and, with his wife, founded Creation Science Supplies and Creation Science Educational Media Services, which provided resources for the teaching of creationism in the public schools of Queensland, a practice allowed at the time. In 1980, the Hams and Mackay merged the two organizations with Carl Wieland's Creation Science Association to form the Creation Science Foundation (CSF).

As CSF's work expanded, Ham moved to the United States in January 1987 to engage in speaking tours with another young Earth creationist organization, the Institute for Creation Research (ICR). His "Back to Genesis" lecture series focused on three major themes – that evolutionary theory had led to cultural decay, that a literal reading of the first eleven chapters of the Book of Genesis contained the true origin of the universe and a pattern for society, and that Christians should engage in a culture war against atheism and humanism. With his popularity growing in the United States, Ham left ICR in 1994 and, with colleagues Mark Looy and Mike Zovath, founded Creation Science Ministries with the assistance of what is now Creation Ministries International (Australia). In 1997, Ham's organization changed its name to Answers in Genesis.

From the time AiG was founded, Ham planned to open a museum and training center near its headquarters in Florence, Kentucky, telling an Australian Broadcasting Corporation interviewer in 2007, "Australia's not really the place to build such a facility if you're going to reach the world. Really, America is." In a separate interview with The Sydney Morning Herald'''s Paul Sheehan, Ham explained, "One of the main reasons [AiG] moved [to Florence] was because we are within one hour's flight of 69 percent of America's population."

In February 2018, Ham was disinvited from the University of Central Oklahoma, where he was scheduled to speak, after an LGBTQ student group objected. Later that month, UCO reinvited Ham to speak, and Ham spoke on March 5 as planned.

Disputes with CMI and GHC
At the end of 2005, the AiG Confederation crumbled due to a disagreement between Ham and Carl Wieland over the "differences in philosophy and operation". This disagreement led to Ham effectively retaining the leadership of the UK and American branches while Wieland served as managing director of the Australian branch and the smaller offices in Canada, New Zealand, and South Africa. This splitting into two groups led to the Australian branch renaming themselves Creation Ministries International (CMI). The AiG stayed with Ham and continued to expand its staff and work closely with the Institute for Creation Research (ICR). Young Earth creationist Kurt Wise was recruited by Ham as a consultant to help with the concluding phases of the museum project.

In May 2007, Creation Ministries International (CMI) filed a lawsuit against Ham and AiG in the Supreme Court of Queensland seeking damages and accusing him of deceptive conduct in his dealings with the Australian organization. Members of the group expressed "concern over Mr. Ham's domination of the groups, the amount of money being spent on his fellow executives and a shift away from delivering the creationist message to raising donations." Ham was accused of trying to send the Australian ministry into bankruptcy. According to the CMI website, this dispute was amicably settled in April 2009. In 2008, Ham appeared in Bill Maher's comedy-documentary Religulous. AiG criticized the movie for what it called Maher's "dishonesty last year in gaining access to the Creation Museum and AiG President Ken Ham."

In March 2011, the board of Great Homeschool Conventions, Inc. (GHC) voted to disinvite Ham and AiG from future conventions. Conference organizer Brennan Dean stated Ham had made "unnecessary, ungodly, and mean-spirited statements that are divisive at best and defamatory at worst". Dean stated further, "We believe Christian scholars should be heard without the fear of ostracism or ad hominem attacks." The disinvitation occurred after Ham criticized Peter Enns of The BioLogos Foundation, who advocated a symbolic, rather than literal, interpretation of the fall of Adam and Eve. Ham accused Enns of espousing "outright liberal theology that totally undermines the authority of the Word of God".

Bill Nye–Ken Ham debate

In February 2014, Ham debated American science educator and engineer Bill Nye (popularly known as "Bill Nye the Science Guy") on the topic of whether young Earth creationism is a viable model of origins in the contemporary scientific era. Critics expressed concern that the debate lent the appearance of scientific legitimacy to creationism while also stimulating Ham's fundraising. Nye said the debate was "an opportunity to expose the well-intending Ken Ham and the support he receives from his followers as being bad for Kentucky, bad for science education, bad for the U.S., and thereby bad for humankind."

Ham said that publicity generated by the debate helped stimulate construction of the Ark Encounter theme park, which had been stalled for lack of funds. The Ark Encounter opened on 7 July 2016, a date (7/7) chosen to correspond with Genesis 7:7, the Bible verse that describes Noah entering the ark. The following day, Nye visited Ark Encounter, and he and Ham had an informal debate.

Beliefs
Creationism
According to Ham, he was inspired by his father, also a young Earth creationist, to interpret the Book of Genesis as "literal history" and first rejected what he termed "molecules-to-man evolution" during high school.

As a young Earth creationist and biblical inerrantist, Ham believes that the Book of Genesis is historical fact. Ham believes the age of the Universe to be about 6,000 years and asserts that Noah's flood occurred about 4,400 years ago in approximately 2348 BC. Astrophysical measurements and radiometric dating show that the age of the universe is about 13.8 billion years and the age of the Earth is about 4.5 billion years. Arguing that knowledge of evolution and the Big Bang require observation rather than inference, Ham urges asking scientists and science educators, "Were you there?" The Talk.origins archive responds that the evidence for evolution "was there," and that knowledge serves to determine what occurred in the past and when. "Were you there?" questions also invalidate creationism as science—an argument with which Ham himself agrees.

Views on sexuality
Ham believes that abortion, same-sex marriage, homosexual behaviour, and being transgender "are all attacks on the true family God ordained in Scripture". He believes that Christians should "take back the rainbow", a popular symbol for the LGBT movement. As a condition for employment at the Ark Encounter, AiG, as directed by Ham, requires workers to sign a statement that they view homosexuality as a sin.

Other beliefs
Ham rejects the scientific consensus on climate change.

Reception
Chris Mooney, of Slate magazine, believes Ham's advocacy of young Earth creation will "undermine science education and U.S. science literacy". But Andrew O'Hehir of Salon argues that the "liberal intelligentsia" have grossly overstated the influence of Ken Ham and those espousing similar views because, while "religious ecstasy, however nonsensical, is powerful in a way reason and logic are not", advocates like Ham "represent a marginalized constituency with little power".

Ham has been awarded honorary degrees by six Christian colleges: Temple Baptist College (1997), Liberty University (2004), Tennessee Temple University (2010), Mid-Continent University (2012), Bryan College (2017), and Mid-America Baptist Theological Seminary (2018).

On February 17, 2020, PBS aired a documentary about the Ark Encounter entitled We Believe in Dinosaurs''. Filmmakers Monica Long Ross and Clayton Brown followed the story line of a "religious organization creating their own alternative science in a legitimate looking museum."

Personal life
Ham is married to Marylin Ham; the couple have five children and eighteen grandchildren.

Works

Notes

References

External links

 Archived at Ghostarchive and the Wayback Machine: 
 

1951 births
Living people
20th-century Australian male writers
20th-century Australian non-fiction writers
20th-century Baptists
21st-century American male writers
21st-century American non-fiction writers
21st-century Australian male writers
21st-century Australian non-fiction writers
21st-century Baptists
American evangelicals
American male non-fiction writers
American religious writers
Australian Baptists
Australian emigrants to the United States
Australian evangelicals
Australian male non-fiction writers
Australian religious writers
Baptists from the United States
Baptist writers
Christian apologists
Christian fundamentalists
Christian Young Earth creationists
Creation scientists
Critics of atheism
People from Cairns
Queensland University of Technology alumni
University of Queensland alumni
Writers from Queensland